Green Zionism is a branch of Zionism that is primarily concerned with the environment of Israel. It mostly fuses Israeli-specific environmental concerns with support for the existence of Israel as a Jewish state. The term itself is a trademark of Aytzim, the first environmental organization to participate in the World Zionist Congress, the World Zionist Organization, and its constituent agencies.

See also
 Aytzim
 The Green Party (Israel)
 The Greens (Israel)
 Meretz

References

External links
Aytzim

Green politics
Types of Zionism
Judaism and environmentalism
Environmentalism in Israel